Tribsees is a municipality in the Vorpommern-Rügen district, in Mecklenburg-Vorpommern, Germany. It is situated 33 km southwest of Stralsund, and 40 km east of Rostock.

Etymology
Tribsees derives its name from a local Slavic tribe (Tribeden) who inhabited the area during the early Middle Ages.

History
The Tribeden are mentioned for the first time in 955, and the town is mentioned in a document in Lübeck in 1241. In 1245 it is noted that the Neuenkamp monastery had the right of patronage over the church in Tribsees. An agreement between the city council of Stralsund and that of Tribsees exists from 1267, and in 1285 the town was granted Lübeck law.  The city was almost completely destroyed in a fire in 1702, but subsequently rebuilt.

The city had 1040 inhabitants in 1782. Roman Catholics were acknowledged in the town only in 1816 and Jews only in 1861. The town population reached its peak in 1861, when there were 3692 inhabitants in Tribsees.

Landmarks
The town church dates from the Middle Ages, it was mentioned for the first time in 1245. It is a Brick Gothic building but has been damaged through fire and war on several occasions throughout its history. In 1861 – 1869 it was renovated in a Neo-Gothic style. The church houses an unusual altarpiece from the early 15th century. It displays the transubstantiation in an allegorical form as a mill operated by angels. The elaborate altarpiece contains 67 sculpted wooden figures, painted and covered with gold leaf.

Two medieval town gates still mark the entrance to the centre of Tribsees, the Mühlentor ("mill gate") and Steintor ("stone gate"). Both date from the 13th century and were originally part of more extensive fortifications which have since disappeared.

Economy
The economy of the town is dominated by small and medium-sized enterprises. There are two wind farms operating in Tribsees.

Notable people
 Johann Joachim Spalding (1 November 1714 – 25 May 1804), theologian and philosopher
 Heinrich Bandlow (14 April 14, 1855 – 25 August 1933), writer
 Manfred Bleskin (13 December 1949 – 21 January 2014), journalist

Gallery

References

Populated places established in the 13th century
1280s establishments in the Holy Roman Empire
1285 establishments in Europe